Progress M-46, identified by NASA as Progress 8P, was a Progress spacecraft used to resupply the International Space Station. It was a Progress-M 11F615A55 spacecraft, with the serial number 246.

Launch
Progress M-46 was launched by a Soyuz-U carrier rocket from Site 1/5 at the Baikonur Cosmodrome. Launch occurred at 05:36:30 UTC on 26 June 2002.

Docking
The spacecraft docked with the aft port of the Zvezda module at 05:36:30 UTC on 29 June 2002. Prior to docking it was used to conduct tests of the Kurs docking system. It remained docked for 87 days before undocking at 13:58:49 UTC on 24 September 2002 to make way for Progress M1-9. It was deorbited at 09:34:00 UTC on 14 October 2002. The spacecraft burned up in the atmosphere over the Pacific Ocean, with any remaining debris landing in the ocean at around 10:21:59 UTC.

Progress M-46 carried supplies to the International Space Station, including food, water and oxygen for the crew and equipment for conducting scientific research.

See also

 List of Progress flights
 Uncrewed spaceflights to the International Space Station

References

Progress (spacecraft) missions
Supply vehicles for the International Space Station
Spacecraft launched in 2002
Spacecraft which reentered in 2002
Spacecraft launched by Soyuz-U rockets